The Pollyanna principle (also called Pollyannaism or positivity bias) is the tendency for people to remember pleasant items more accurately than unpleasant ones. Research indicates that at the subconscious level, the mind tends to focus on the optimistic; while at the conscious level, it tends to focus on the negative. This subconscious bias is similar to the Barnum effect.

Development

The name derives from the 1913 novel Pollyanna by Eleanor H. Porter describing a girl who plays the "glad game"—trying to find something to be glad about in every situation. The novel has been adapted to film several times, most famously in 1920 and 1960. An early use of the name "Pollyanna" in psychological literature was in 1969 by Boucher and Osgood who described a Pollyanna hypothesis as a universal human tendency to use positive words more frequently and diversely than negative words in communicating. Empirical evidence for this tendency has been provided by computational analyses of large corpora of text.

The story of Pollyanna is about an orphaned little girl, who is sent to live with her Aunt Polly, who is known for being stiff, strict, and proper. When thrown into this environment, Pollyanna seeks to keep and spread her optimism to others. This beloved literary character’s story shares the message that despite how hard things may seem, a sunny disposition can turn anyone and anything around.

Psychological research and findings
The Pollyanna principle was described by Margaret Matlin and David Stang in 1978 using the archetype of Pollyanna more specifically as a psychological principle which portrays the positive bias people have when thinking of the past. According to the Pollyanna principle, the brain processes information that is pleasing and agreeable in a more precise and exact manner as compared to unpleasant information. We actually tend to remember past experiences as more rosy than they actually occurred. The researchers found that people expose themselves to positive stimuli and avoid negative stimuli, they take longer to recognize what is unpleasant or threatening than what is pleasant and safe, and they report that they encounter positive stimuli more frequently than they actually do. Matlin and Stang also determined that selective recall was a more likely occurrence when recall was delayed: the longer the delay, the more selective recall that occurred.

The Pollyanna principle has been observed on online social networks as well. For example, Twitter users preferentially share more, and are emotionally affected more frequently by, positive information.

However, the only exception to the Pollyanna principle tends to be individuals suffering from depression or anxiety, who are more likely to either have more depressive realism or a negative bias.

Positivity bias

Positivity bias is the part of the Pollyanna principle that attributes reasons to why people may choose positivity over negative or realistic mindsets. In positive psychology, it is broken down into three ideas: positive illusions, self deception, and optimism.
Having a positive bias increases with age, as it is more prevalent in adults approaching older adulthood than younger children or adolescents. Older adults tend to pay attention to positive information, and this could be due to a specific focus in cognitive processing. In studies compiled by Andrew Reed and Laura Carstensen, they found that older adults (in comparison to younger adults) purposefully directed their attention away from negative material.

Criticisms
Although the Pollyanna principle can be seen as helpful in some situations, some psychologists say it may inhibit an individual from coping effectively with life obstacles. The Pollyanna principle in some instances can be known as "Pollyanna syndrome" and is defined by such skeptics as a person who is excessively positive and blind towards the negative or real. In regards to therapy or counseling, it is viewed as dangerous to both the therapist and patient.

See also

 Appeal to flattery
 Cloud cuckoo land
 Cornucopian
 Confirmation bias
 Depressive realism
 Illusory superiority
 Negativity bias
 Optimism bias
 Overconfidence effect
 Positivity offset
 Reality principle
 Scotomization
 Self-deception
 Self-serving bias
 Wishful thinking

References

Bibliography

 
 
 
 
 
 
 
 
 
 
 
 
 
 
 

Cognitive biases
Figures of speech
Principles